The Caine Prize for African Writing is an annual literary award for the best original short story by an African writer, whether in Africa or elsewhere, published in the English language. Founded in the United Kingdom in 2000, the £10,000 prize was named in memory of businessman and philanthropist Sir Michael Harris Caine, former Chairman of Booker Group plc and of the Booker Prize management committee. Because of this connection with the Booker Prize, the Caine Prize is sometimes called the "African Booker".  The prize is known as the AKO Caine Prize for African Writing. The Chair of the Board is Ellah Wakatama, appointed in 2019.

History and background 
The Caine Prize is a registered charity with the aim of bringing African writing to a wider audience through an annual literary award. It is named after businessman and philanthropist Sir Michael Caine (1927–1999), former Chairman of Booker plc, who also chaired the "Africa95" arts festival and the Booker Prize management committee for almost 25 years. After his death, friends and colleagues established the prize to be awarded annually in his memory.

The prize was first awarded in 2000, to the Sudanese writer Leila Aboulela for her short story "The Museum", at the Zimbabwe International Book Fair in Harare. In its first year the Caine Prize attracted entries from 20 African countries.

The winner is announced at a dinner in July, formerly held in Oxford but most recently at SOAS, University of London, to which the shortlisted candidates are all invited. This is part of a week of activities for the candidates, including readings, book signings and press opportunities.

Additionally, the Caine Prize arranges writers' workshops that are held in a different African country each year.

Supporters
Among supporters of the prize are friends of Sir Michael Caine in the UK, United States and Africa, the Oppenheimer Memorial Trust, the Zochonis Foundation, the Marit & Hans Rausing Foundation, the Gatsby Charitable Foundation, the Headley Trust, the Esmee Fairbairn Charitable Trust, the David Alliance Family Foundation, the Cairns Charitable Trust, the Botwinick-Wolfensohn Family Foundation, the Sunrise Foundation, the Von Clemm Charitable Trust, the Royal Over-Seas League, Sarova Hotels, Bata Shoes (Kenya) Ltd and (Zimbabwe) Ltd and Kenya Airways.

The four African winners of the Nobel Prize for Literature have supported the Caine Prize as patrons: Wole Soyinka, Nadine Gordimer, Naguib Mahfouz and J. M. Coetzee. Baroness Nicholson of Winterbourne, Sir Michael's widow, was founding President of the council and Jonathan Taylor the first Chair.

Critical reception
In 2011, African writer Ikhide R. Ikheloa criticized the prize, suggesting that "The creation of a prize for 'African writing' may have created the unintended effect of breeding writers willing to stereotype Africa for glory. The mostly lazy, predictable stories that made the 2011 shortlist celebrate orthodoxy and mediocrity.... The problem now is that many writers are skewing their written perspectives to fit what they imagine will sell to the West and the judges of the Caine Prize...."

List of winners

Notes

References
Rose-Innes, Henrietta. 2009. Ten Years of the Caine Prize for African Writing. New Internationalist Publications (Oxford, United Kingdom).

External links
Caine Prize for African Writing, official website

African literary awards 
English literary awards 
Awards established in 2000
2000 establishments in England
Short story awards
English-language literary awards